Kyriaki is a village in the central part of the Evros regional unit in Greece, in the municipal unit of Orfeas of the municipality Soufli. With 100 inhabitants (2011 census) it is the least populated community in the municipal unit. Kyriaki is in a valley in the wooded Eastern Rhodope Mountains, 15 km southeast of the Bulgarian-Greek border. It is situated between the villages Mikro Dereio and Protokklisi.

Population

History

The village was founded by the Ottoman Turks in the 14th century, it was known as Kayadjik(Turkish: Kayajik).  Its population was 310 Bulgarian families in 1830, 236 families (houses) in 1878, and 230 families in 1912.  According to professor Lyubomir Miletich, the 1912 population had around 200 Bulgarian families. After a brief period of Bulgarian rule between 1913 and 1919, it became part of Greece. As a result its Bulgarian and Turkish population was exchanged with Greek refugees, mainly from today's Turkey.

Person

Nikola Atanasov Spirov (1908-?), Bulgarian leader of the Internal Thracian Revolutionary Organisation (1944–1961)

See also
List of settlements in the Evros regional unit

External links
Kyriaki on GTP Travel Pages

References

Populated places in Evros (regional unit)